Commercial Building is a historic commercial building located at South Bend, St. Joseph County, Indiana. It was built in 1921–1922, and is a small two-story, red brick building with terra cotta trim.  The building has housed a number of small commercial enterprises.  It is located between the Berteling Building and I&M Building.

It was listed on the National Register of Historic Places in 1985.

References

Commercial buildings on the National Register of Historic Places in Indiana
Commercial buildings completed in 1922
Buildings and structures in South Bend, Indiana
National Register of Historic Places in St. Joseph County, Indiana